Ben Hunt may refer to:

Ben Hunt (baseball) (1888–1927), American Major League Baseball pitcher in the 1910s
Ben Hunt (basketball) (born 1978), Australian basketball player
Ben Hunt (footballer) (born 1990), English footballer
Ben Hunt (rugby league) (born 1990), Australian rugby league footballer
W. Ben Hunt (1888–1970), American artist, outdoor educator and author
Ben Hunt-Davis (born 1972), rower
Ben Hunt (American football) (born 1900), American football player